Gangsta Funk is the second studio album by the 5th Ward Boyz, released in 1994.

The album was produced mostly by Mike Dean and N.O. Joe. Gangsta Funk peaked at No. 105 on the Billboard 200 and No. 13 on Billboard'''s R&B/Hip-Hop chart, becoming the group's highest charting album.

"Ghetto Curse Words" and "Same Ol'" appeared on the 5th Ward Boyz' previous album, Ghetto Dope''.

Track listing
"Once Again It's On"- 4:33  
"Lo Life in the Street"- 4:29  
"Gangsta Funk"- 4:34  
"Ghetto Curse Words"- 2:09  
"Underground G's"- 6:45  
"Same Ol'"- 3:11  
"Reason"- 5:03  
"Funk Outro"- 4:08

Charts

References

1994 albums
Albums produced by Mike Dean (record producer)
Albums produced by N.O. Joe
5th Ward Boyz albums
Rap-A-Lot Records albums
Virgin Records albums